Paragassizocrinus is an extinct genus of sea lily belonging to the family Agassizocrinidae.

References 

Paleozoic echinoderms
Cladida